The ophryon is the point in the forehead just above the optic foramen, or eyesocket, and glabella.

References 

Neurochirurgie Lexikon - Ophyron

Skull